Marianne Baxter is a professor of economics at Boston University. She obtained her PhD from the University of Chicago and a bachelor from the University of Rochester. She is a research associate at the NBER. She is the 412th most cited economist in the world according to IDEAS.

She started as a lecturer at the University of Chicago from 1980 to 1982, and was then assistant professor at the University of California at Santa Barbara and the University of Rochester. She then became associate professor at the University of Virginia between 1993 and 1995 before being promoted to full professor in 1995. In 2000, she became professor at Boston University. In 2002–2003, she was a visiting professor at Harvard University.

Research 
Her research looks into International Economics, Macroeconomics and International Finance. Her works have been cited over 13000 times. Her research has been published in the American Economic Review, The Review of Economics and Statistics and the Journal of Monetary Economics.

Her research has been quoted in the Investors Chronicle, Atlantico and the Daily Free Press.

Selected bibliography 

 Baxter, Marianne; Kouparitsas, Michael A. (2003). "Trade Structure, Industrial Structure, and International Business Cycles". American Economic Review. 93 (2): 51–56. 
 Baxter, Marianne; Jermann, Urban J. (1999). "Household Production and the Excess Sensitivity of Consumption to Current Income". American Economic Review. 89 (4): 902–920.
 Baxter, Marianne; King, Robert G. (1999-11-01). "Measuring Business Cycles: Approximate Band-Pass Filters for Economic Time Series". The Review of Economics and Statistics. 81 (4): 575–593.

References 

Living people
Year of birth missing (living people)
Boston University faculty
University of Chicago alumni
University of Rochester alumni
University of California, Santa Barbara faculty
University of Rochester faculty
University of Virginia faculty
20th-century American economists
21st-century American economists
American women economists
University of Chicago faculty
20th-century American women
21st-century American women